Antonio Sabato may refer to:

Antonio Sabàto, Sr. (1943–2021), Italian actor
Antonio Sabàto, Jr. (born 1972), model and actor
Antonio Sabato (footballer) (born 1958), retired Italian professional football player